The NWA Mid-America Tag Team championship was a tag team title promoted by the American professional wrestling promotion NWA Mid-America that ran more or less exclusively in Alabama, Tennessee, and Kentucky, United States, from the 1940s until 1980. Originally the NWA Mid-America promoted their version of the NWA World Tag-Team titles but when they became defunct in 1977 the "Mid-America" title became the main title for the promotion. The titles were reactivated in 2001 under NWA Nashville's patronage and continued to exist until 2011 when they were again abandoned.

Title history

Combined reigns 

{| class="wikitable sortable" style="text-align: center"
!Rank
!Team
!No. ofreigns
!Combineddays
|-
!1
|Jeff Daniels and Steve Olsonoski || 1 || 826
|-
!rowspan=2|2
| Disturbing Behaviour || 3 || 301
|-
| Jeff Daniels and Mike Woods || 1 || 301
|-
!4
|  || 1 || 178
|-
!5
| Andy Douglas and Ricky Santell || 1 || 161
|-
!6
| The Samoans/The Manchurrians || 4 || 150
|-
!7
| The Syndicate Crew || 1 || 140
|-
!8
| The Heartbreakers || 2 || 121
|-
!9
| Kory Williams and Kid Thrilla || 2 ||style="background-color:#bbeeff"| ¤100
|-
!10
| Sudden Impact || 3 || 99
|-
!11
| Bryan Turner and Dan Morrow || 2 || 79
|-
!12
| The Syndicate Crew || 1 || 76
|-
!13
| Dante and Mephisto II || 1 || 61
|-
!14
| John Noble and Robbie Ruffin || 1 || 56
|-
!15
|  || 3 ||style="background-color:#bbeeff"| ¤51
|-
!16
|  and George Gulas || 3 || style="background-color:#bbeeff"| ¤42
|-
!17
| Dante and Leatherface || 1 || 35
|-
!18
| The Syndicate Crew || 1 || 33
|-
!19
|  and Eddie Marlin || 3 || style="background-color:#bbeeff"| ¤32-49
|-
!20
| The Interns || 6 || 31
|-
!rowspan=2|21
| and Chris Gallagher || 2 || style="background-color:#bbeeff"| ¤30
|-
| || 3 || style="background-color:#bbeeff"| ¤30
|-
!23
| Kory Williams and Mike Woods || 1 || 29
|-
!24
| Tojo Yamamoto and Johnny Marlin || 1 || 28
|-
!rowspan=2|25
|Ashley Hudson and Tim Renesto || 1 || 27
|-
|Dante and Tim Renesto || 1 || 27
|-
!27
| Devil's Disciples || 2 ||style="background-color:#bbeeff"| ¤25
|-
!rowspan=2|28
|Gypsy Joe and Tom Renesto Jr. || 1 || 21
|-
|  || 2 || style="background-color:#bbeeff"| ¤21
|-
!rowspan=2|30
| Gypsy Joe and Leroy Rochester || 1 || 20
|-
| Justin Sane and Natas || 1 || 20
|-
!rowspan=3|32
| Bearcat Brown and Don Greene || 1 || 14
|-
|  and Count Drummer || 1 || 14
|-
| Rocky Brewer and Pat Rose || 1 || 14
|-
!35
| Tojo Yamamoto and Bill Dromo || 3 || style="background-color:#bbeeff"| ¤13
|-
!36
| Sweet N Sassy || 1 || 11
|-
!37
|  and Robert Gibson || 1 || 10
|-
!rowspan=7|38
| George Gulas and Ken Lucas || 1 || 7
|-
|Gypsy Joe and Buzz Tyler || 1 || 7
|-
| Jim Dalton and Butch Malone || 1 || 7
|-
|  and Tommy Rich || 1 || 7
|-
|  and Bill Dundee || 1 || 7
|-
| Steve Kovacs and Ricky Gibson || 1 || 7
|-
| The Masked Godfathers || 1 || 7
|-
!45
| Brandon Stone and Johnny Gunnz || 1 || 2
|-
!46
| Jody Lopez and Rick Thunder || 1 || 1
|-
!47
| The Continental Warriors || 5 || style="background-color:#bbeeff"| ¤0-49
|-
!48
|  and Eddie Marlin || 1 || style="background-color:#bbeeff"| ¤0-17
|-
!49
|Jeff Daniels and Lonestar || 1 || <1
|-
!rowspan=31|50
| Terry Garvin and Duke Myers || 4 || style="background-color:#bbeeff"| ¤N/A
|-
| George Gulas and Rocky Brewer || 2 ||style="background-color:#bbeeff"| ¤N/A
|-
| George Gulas and Tojo Yamamoto || 2 || style="background-color:#bbeeff"| ¤N/A
|-
| Gypsy Joe and Tojo Yamamoto || 2 || style="background-color:#bbeeff"| ¤N/A
|-
|  and Dutch Mantell || 2 || style="background-color:#bbeeff"| ¤N/A
|-
| Len Rossi and Tony Charles || 2 || style="background-color:#bbeeff"| ¤N/A
|-
| Pez Whatley and Ray Candy || 2 || style="background-color:#bbeeff"| ¤N/A
|-
| The Bicenntenial Kings || 2 || style="background-color:#bbeeff"| ¤N/A
|-
| The Garvin Brothers || 2 || style="background-color:#bbeeff"| ¤N/A
|-
|  and Gypsy Joe || 2 ||style="background-color:#bbeeff"| ¤N/A
|-
|  and Jackie Fargo || 2 || style="background-color:#bbeeff"| ¤N/A
|-
| Bearcat Brown and Joey Rossi || 1 || style="background-color:#bbeeff"| ¤N/A
|-
| and David Schultz || 1 || style="background-color:#bbeeff"| ¤N/A
|-
| Bobby Eaton and Great Togo || 1 ||style="background-color:#bbeeff"| ¤N/A
|-
| Duke Myers and Blue Scorpion || 1 || style="background-color:#bbeeff"| ¤N/A
|-
| Frank Monte and Nick DeCarlo || 1 || style="background-color:#bbeeff"| ¤N/A
|-
| Frank Morrell and Charles Morrell || 1 || style="background-color:#bbeeff"| ¤N/A
|-
| George Gulas and Gorgeous George Jr. || 1 || style="background-color:#bbeeff"| ¤N/A
|-
| Great Fuji and Steve Kyle || 1 || style="background-color:#bbeeff"| ¤N/A
|-
| Gypsy Joe and Dutch Mantell || 1 || style="background-color:#bbeeff"| ¤N/A
|-
| Joey Rossi and Don Greene || 1 || style="background-color:#bbeeff"| ¤N/A
|-
| and Otto Von Heller || 1 || style="background-color:#bbeeff"| ¤N/A
|-
|  and Frankie Laine || 1 || style="background-color:#bbeeff"| ¤N/A
|-
|  and Ray Candy || 1 || style="background-color:#bbeeff"| ¤N/A
|-
|  and Ricky Morton || 1 ||style="background-color:#bbeeff"| ¤N/A
|-
| and Bobby Eaton/Pez Whatley || 1 || style="background-color:#bbeeff"| ¤N/A
|-
| Len Rossi and Bearcat Brown || 1 || style="background-color:#bbeeff"| ¤N/A
|-
| Lorenzo Parente and Bill Dromo || 1 || style="background-color:#bbeeff"| ¤N/A
|-
| Rex Sexton and Tommy Capone || 1 ||style="background-color:#bbeeff"| ¤N/A
|-
| The Heavenly Bodies || 1 ||style="background-color:#bbeeff"| ¤N/A
|-
|  and Great Togo || 1 || style="background-color:#bbeeff"| ¤N/A
|-

Notes
 –

References

Tag team wrestling championships
United States regional professional wrestling championships
NWA Mid-America championships